Buzovna (also, Busovny, Busowny, Buzouvna, and Buzovny) is a settlement and municipality in Baku, Azerbaijan.  It has a population of 26,283.

Notable natives 

 Nuraddin Ibrahimov — National Hero of Azerbaijan.
 Sidqi Ruhullah — Azerbaijani Soviet actor, People's Artist of USSR (1949)

Photos

Ancient cemeteries in Buzovna

References

External links

Populated places in Baku
Resorts in Azerbaijan